Espinosa de Villagonzalo is a municipality located in the province of Palencia, Castile and León, Spain. According to the 2004 census (INE), the municipality had a population of 226 inhabitants.

See also
Tierra de Campos

References 

Municipalities in the Province of Palencia